The National Institute of Justice (NIJ) is the research, development and evaluation agency of the United States Department of Justice. NIJ, along with the Bureau of Justice Statistics (BJS), Bureau of Justice Assistance (BJA), Office of Juvenile Justice and Delinquency Prevention (OJJDP), Office for Victims of Crime (OVC), and other program offices, comprise the Office of Justice Programs (OJP) branch of the Department of Justice.

History

The National Institute of Law Enforcement and Criminal Justice was established on October 21, 1968, under the Omnibus Crime Control and Safe Streets Act of 1968, as a component of the Law Enforcement Assistance Administration (LEAA). In 1978, it was renamed as the National Institute of Justice. Some functions of the LEAA were absorbed by NIJ on December 27, 1979, with passage of the Justice System Improvement Act of 1979. The act, which amended the Omnibus Crime Control and Safe Streets Act of 1968, also led to creation of the Bureau of Justice Statistics. In 1982, the LEAA was succeeded by the Office of Justice Assistance, Research, and Statistics (1982–1984) and then the Office of Justice Programs in 1984.

NIJ was notable among U.S. governmental research organizations because it is headed by a political appointee of the president rather than by a scientist or a member of the civil service. The Presidential Appointment Efficiency and Streamlining Act of 2011 removed the need for Senate confirmation of the NIJ director.

In 2010, the United States National Research Council released a report on reforming the NIJ, and identified issues with its independence, budget, and scientific mission. While it considered making the NIJ separate from its current department, Office of Justice Programs, it recommended retaining the NIJ within the OJP but giving it increased independence and authority through clear qualifications for its director, control over its budget, and a statutory advisory board. It also recommended that the NIJ: (1) a focus on research rather than forensic capacity building activities,(2) increase funding for programs for graduate researchers, (3) increase transparency, and (4) do periodic self-assessments.

Research areas

NIJ is focused on advancing technology for criminal justice application including law enforcement and corrections, forensics, and judicial processes, as well as criminology, criminal justice, and related social science research. Much of this research is facilitated by providing grants to academic institutions, non-profit research organizations, and other entities, as well as collaborating with state and local governments. Areas of social science research include violence against women, corrections, and crime prevention, as well as program evaluation.
  
Grants for technology development help facilitate research and development of technology and tools for criminal justice application, which is a need that the private sector is otherwise reluctant to meet. NIJ also supports development of voluntary equipment performance standards, as well as conducting compliance testing. Areas of technology research and development include biometrics, communications interoperability, information technology, less-lethal technologies (e.g. tasers), and officer safety including bullet-proof vests. Crime mapping and analysis is a topic that includes both technology and social science (geography) aspects. The National Law Enforcement and Corrections Technology Centers, which are located throughout the United States, play a role in law enforcement technology development, testing, and dissemination.

In the 2000s, NIJ developed the National Missing and Unidentified Persons System.

DNA initiative
A major area of research and support is for forensics and the president's DNA initiative. The Federal Bureau of Investigation developed the Combined DNA Index System (CODIS) system as a central database of DNA profiles taken from offenders. In the late 1980s and 1990s, all of the states and the federal government required DNA samples to be collected from offenders in certain types of cases. The demand (casework) for DNA analysis in public crime laboratories increased 73% from 1997 to 2000, and by 2003, there was a backlog of 350,000 rape and homicide cases. In 2003, President George W. Bush proposed the Advancing Justice Through DNA Technology initiative, which would include $1 billion over five years to reduce backlogs, develop and improve capacity of state and local law enforcement to use DNA analysis, support research and development to improve the technology, and additional training for those working in the criminal justice system.

Technical working groups

Technical working groups (or TWGs) were created by the National Institute of Justice to create crime scene guides for state and local law enforcement. The guides were individually developed by a separate Technical Working Group tasked with a single topic. The groups were a multidisciplinary group of content-area experts from across the United States. The groups included urban and rural jurisdictions as well as Federal agencies representatives. Each participating member was experienced in the area of crime scene investigation and evidence collection in the criminal justice system from the standpoints of law enforcement, prosecution, defense, or forensic science. The Technical Working Groups were designed to be short term in duration to respond to a topic. Longer term groups exists under other organizations such as the FBI's Scientific Working Group (SWG's) on Digital Evidence.

Technology Working Group topics have included:

During the several years of their existence they developed numerous guides including the following:
 Crime Scene Investigation: A Reference for Law Enforcement (pdf, 60 pages) Published June 2004
 Death Investigation: A Guide for the Scene Investigator (pdf, 72 pages) Published November 1999
 Fire and Arson Scene Evidence: A Guide for Public Safety Personnel (pdf, 73 pages) Published June 2000
 Guide for Explosion and Bombing Scene Investigation (pdf, 64 pages) Published July 2000
 Electronic Crime Scene Investigation: A Guide for First Responders (pdf, 93 pages) First Edition published July 2001, second edition published 2008

See also
 Law Enforcement Assistance Administration (LEAA)
 National Criminal Justice Reference Service (NCJRS)
 National Law Enforcement and Corrections Technology Center (NLECTC)

References

External links

National Institute of Justice in the Federal Register
National Criminal Justice Reference Service
National Law Enforcement and Corrections Technology Center (NLECTC)
The President's DNA Initiative
New NIJ Body Armor Standards

Government agencies established in 1968
United States Department of Justice